Organodesma is a genus of moths belonging to the family Tineidae. The genus was described in 1965 by Hungarian entomologist László Anthony Gozmány.

Species
Organodesma arsiptila (Meyrick, 1931) (Cameroon, Congo)
Organodesma aurocrata Gozmány, 1976 (Congo)
Organodesma erinacea (Walker, 1863) (South Africa, Zambia)
Organodesma heptazona (Meyrick, 1931) (Sierra Leone)
Organodesma leucomicra (Gozmány, 1966) (Ghana, Uganda)
Organodesma merui Gozmány, 1969 (Tanzania)
Organodesma onomasta Gozmány & Vári, 1975 (Tanzania, Zambia)
Organodesma optata Gozmány, 1967 (Congo)
Organodesma ornata Gozmány, 1966
Organodesma petaloxantha (Meyrick, 1931) (Cameroon, Congo, Zambia)
Organodesma psapharogma (Meyrick, 1936) (Congo)
Organodesma simplex Gozmány, 1967 (Congo)

References
Gozmány L. A. 1965c. Four new Tineid Genera from Central Africa. - Lambillionea 64(1–4):2–8.

Siloscinae
Tineidae genera